Area codes 902 and 782 are telephone area codes in the North American Numbering Plan (NANP) for the Canadian provinces of Nova Scotia and Prince Edward Island.  Area code 902 was one of the original North American area codes established in October 1947.

The numbering plan area (NPA) 902 originally consisted of three Maritime provinces, with Newfoundland added shortly after it joined Canada in 1949. New Brunswick, along with Newfoundland, was assigned area code 506 in 1955. Newfoundland (now Newfoundland and Labrador) subsequently received a distinct area code, 709, in early 1962.

In August 2014, area code 782 was added as a second area code for the 902 numbering plan area for central office code relief to prevent telephone number shortages, creating an overlay complex in the provinces, which required ten-digit dialing for all local calls.

The incumbent local exchange carrier in the numbering plan area is Bell Aliant, which was produced from a merger that included Island Telecom Inc. (formerly Island Telephone, but both were informally shortened to Island Tel), Maritime Telephone and Telegraph (MT&T), New Brunswick Tel (NBTel) and NewTel Communications (NewTel).

Overlay 
In Canada, telephone numbering resources are allocated to competing carrier in blocks of 10,000 numbers, corresponding to a single three-digit central office prefix, in every rate centre in which the carrier offers new service, and every local interconnect region in which it intends to port existing numbers. While most rate centres do not need nearly that many numbers, but number pooling is not used as a relief measure, and numbers cannot be reallocated once assigned to a carrier and rate centre. While only 1.06 million people reside in numbering plan area 902, which provides 7.8 million possible seven-digit telephone numbers, the area code was projected to be exhausted by 2015.

In October 2012, area code 782 was announced for relief, which overlays the entire 902 area. Ten-digit dialing was mandatory in Nova Scotia and Prince Edward Island as of November 30, 2014.  The decision to implement a bi-provincial overlay may have been unusual, but was made to spare residents in rural areas of Nova Scotia and Prince Edward Island the burden of having to change numbers. As a result, the 782 area code was introduced on August 23, 2014. A recorded message reminding callers that 10-digit dialling would become mandatory on November 30 was activated on August 23. Exchanges in 782 were made available to telephone service providers on May 30, 2014, with numbers being assigned to customers once 10-digit dialing was activated.

Service area
The number plan area 902/782 is unusual in that it spans two entire provinces, much like area code 867 is shared by the three Canadian territories: Northwest Territories, Nunavut, and Yukon. This practice is unique to Canada, although was practiced also in the Caribbean.

Nova Scotia 
Amherst (902) - 297 397 602 614 617 660 661 664 667 669 694 699 906 991
Annapolis Royal (782) - 349, (902) - 286 526 532 907 955
Antigonish (902) - 318 338 604 735 863 867 870 872 908 948 968 971 995 
Argyle (902) - 570 643
Arichat (902) - 226
Aylesford (782) - 350, (902) - 321 341 389 847
Baddeck (782) - 235, (902) - 294 295 296 933
Bass River (902) - 647
Bear River (902) -  376 467 638
Barrington (782) - 351, (902) - 320 575 581 619 630 635 637 768 903 972
Bedford - see Bedford in Halifax Regional Municipality
Berwick (902) -  375 534 538
Blandford (902) - 228
Bridgetown (902) - 312 588 665
Bridgewater (902) - 212 298 514 521 523 527 529 530 541 543 553 605 904 930 936 990
Brookfield (902) - 650 673
Brooklyn (782) - 341, (902) - 253 757
Caledonia (902)  - 390 682 909
Canning (902) - 582
Canso (902) - 366
Carleton (902) - 761
Chelsea (902) - 685
Chester (902)  - 204 275 273 279 299 912 937 973 980
Cheticamp (782) - 236, (902) - 224 264 335 913
Cheverie (902) - 632
Clark's Harbour (902) - 745
Clarksville (902)  - 632
Country Harbour (902) - 328 573
Dartmouth - see Dartmouth in Halifax Regional Municipality
Debert (782)-342, (902)  - 641 662
Digby (782)-347 820, (902)  - 224 245 247 249 250 308 340 378 974
Dingwall (902) - 383
East Bay (902) - 255 822 828
Ecum Secum - see Ecum Secum in Halifax Regional Municipality
Economy (902) - 647
Elmsdale - see Elmsdale in Halifax Regional Municipality
Enfield - see Elmsdale in Halifax Regional Municipality
Glace Bay (902) - 842 849
Goldboro (902) - 387
Goshen (902) - 783
Grand Narrows (902) - 622 636 716
Great Village (902) - 655 668
Greenwood - see Kingston 
Guysborough (902) - 533
The Halifax Regional Municipality contains multiple telephone rate centres:
Bedford (902) - 832 835 
Dartmouth (902) - 433 434 435 460 461 462 463 464 465 466 468 469 481 
Ecum Secum (902)  -  347
Elmsdale (902) - 259 883
Halifax city centre (782) - 234, 414, 845, 847, 848, 849,  (902) - 209 210 219 220 221 222 223 225 229 233 237 240 244 266 268 292 293 329 332 333 334 337 342 344 346 347 359 377 384 399 401 402 403 404 405 406 407 410 412 414 415 417 420 421 422 423 424 425 426 427 428 429 430 431 440 441 442 443 444 445 446 448 449 450 451 452 453 454 455 456 457 458 459 470 471 473 474 475 476 477 478 479 480 482 483 484 486 487 488 489 490 491 492 493 494 495 496 497 498 499 501 502 503 520 536 551 558 559 568 571 576 579 580 593 700 701 702 703 704 705 706 707 708 714 715 717 718 719 720 721 722 789 797 800 801 802 809 817 818 827 830 868 873 876 877 878 880 889 891 932 949 981 982 989 997 998 999
Head of St. Margarets Bay (902) - 820 821 826
Hubbards (902) - 857 858
Ketch Harbour (902) - 346 868
Lake Echo (902) - 829
Middle Musquodoboit (902) - 384
Musquodoboit Harbour (782) - 344, 824, (902) - 337 342 878 889 891 983
Porter's Lake (902) - 281 827 
Prospect Road (902) - 850 852  
Sackville (902) - 252 864 865 869
Sheet Harbour (902)  - 391 591 696 885
Tangier (902) - 772
Upper Musquodoboit (902) - 325 568
Waverley (902) - 860 861 873
Hantsport (902) - 352 684
Heatherton (902) - 386
Head of St. Margarets Bay - see Head of St. Margarets Bay in Halifax Regional Municipality
Hubbards - see Hubbards in Halifax Regional Municipality
Inverness (902) - 280 258 323 615
Iona (902) - 725
Judique see Port Hood
Kentville (902)  - 300 326 365 385 599 670 678 679 680 681 690 691 692 698 938 993
Kenzieville (902) - 924
Ketch Harbour see Ketch Harbour in Halifax Regional Municipality
Kingston (782)- 352, (902) - 242 760 765 804 996
LaHave (902) - 688
Lake Echo - see Lake Echo in Halifax Regional Municipality
Lawrencetown (902)  - 584
L'Ardoise (902)  - 587, 793
Liscomb (902)  - 779
Liverpool (782) - 339, 821, (902) - 343 350 354 356 642 646 803 975
Lockeport (902) - 656
Louisbourg (902) - 596 733
Louisdale (902) - 345 796
Lunenburg (902) - 634 640
Mabou (902) - 945
Maccan (902) - 274 545
Maitland (902) - 261
Marion Bridge (902) - 727, 946
Mahone Bay (902) - 531 624 627
Margaree Forks (902)  - 248
Margaree Harbour (902) - 235
Melrose (902) - 833
Meteghan (902) - 645
Middleton  (782) - 348 822, (902) - 309 322 349 363 824 825 840
Middle Musquodoboit - see Middle Musquodoboit in Halifax Regional Municipality
Mill Village (902) - 677 935
Monastery (902) - 232 234
Mount Uniacke (902) - 256 866
Mulgrave (902) - 287 747
Musquodoboit Harbour - see Musquodoboit Harbour in Halifax Regional Municipality
New Germany (902) - 398 644
New Glasgow (782) - 233 440 978, (902) - 301 331 419 505 507 513 600 601 616 695 752 753 754 755 759 771 921 928 931 934 952 967
New Ross (902) - 689
New Waterford (902) - 592 862
North Sydney (902) - 794
Oxford (902) - 447 552
Parrsboro (782) - 343, (902) - 216 254 590 613 728 744
Pictou (902) - 382 485
Port Bickerton (902) - 364
Porter's Lake - see Porters Lake in Halifax Regional Municipality
Port Hawkesbury (782) - 825, (902) - 227 302 623 625 631 738 777 939 951 984
Port Hood (902) - 787
Port Maitland (902) - 649
Port Morien (902) - 554 737
Prospect Road - see Prospect in Halifax Regional Municipality
The Pubnicos (902) - 762 927
Pugwash (902) - 243
Queensport (902) - 358
River Hebert (902) - 251 732
River John (902) - 351
Riverport (902) - 764 766
Sackville - see Sackville in Halifax Regional Municipality
Sandy Cove (902) - 834
St. Anns (902) - 929
Saulnierville (782) - 353, (902) - 205 260 540 769 770 773 778
Stellarton - see New Glasgow
Stewiacke (902) - 639
Salt Springs (902) - 925
Shubenacadie (902) - 203 236 750 751 758 767 987
Shelburne (782) - 354, (902) - 207 265 319 512 874 875 879 985
Sherbrooke (902)  - 522
Sheet Harbour - see Sheet Harbour in Halifax Regional Municipality
Springfield (902) - 547
Springhill (902) - 597 763
Head of St. Margarets Bay - see Head of St. Margarets Bay in Halifax Regional Municipality
St. Peters (902)  - 535 785
Sydney (782) - 777, (902) - 202 217 270 284 304 317 322 371 408 416 500 509 536 537 539 549 560 561 562 563 564 565 567 574 577 578 590 595 780 919 979
Sydney Mines (902) - 241 544 736
Tangier - see Tangier in Halifax Regional Municipality
Tatamagouche (902) - 657
Trenton (902) - see New Glasgow
Truro  (902) - 305 324 603 606 814 843 890 893 895 896 897 898 899 920 953 956 957 977 986
Tusket  (902) - 648 941
Wallace (902) - 257
Walton (902) - 528
Waverley - see Waverley in Halifax Regional Municipality
Wedgeport (902) - 663 965
Wentworth (902) - 548
Westville (902) - 396
Weymouth  (782) - 346, 826, (902) - 515 837 841
Whycocomagh (902) - 756
Windsor (902) -  306 321 472 589 788 790 791 792 798 799 901 994
Wolfville (902) - 320 542 585 697
Woods Harbour  (902) - 373 723
Upper Musquodoboit - see Upper Musquodoboit in Halifax Regional Municipality
Yarmouth  (782) - 345, (902) - 307 395 400 413 504 508 740 742 746 748 749 774 815 881 966 988

Prince Edward Island 
Alberton (902) - 206 214 231 853 856 960
Borden-Carleton (902) -  437 729 855
Cardigan (902) - 583
Charlottetown (782) - 823, 843, 844, 846, (902) - 213 218 239 288 314 316 330 355 367 368 370 388 393 394 409 519 556 557 566 569 607 620 626 628 629 781 812 892 894 916 940 948 978
Crapaud (902) - 658 730
Eldon (902) - 659
Georgetown (902) - 652 808
Hunter River (902) - 621 734 964
Kensington (902) - 836
Montague (902) - 313 326 361 784 838 846 969
Morell-St. Peters (902) -  961
Mount Stewart (902) -  676
Murray River (902) - 741 962
New Haven (902) - 675
New London (902) - 886
O'Leary (902) - 726 807 859
Rusticoville (902) - 963
Souris (902) - 208 215 327 687 743
Summerside  (902) - 303 301 315 358 374 381 432 436 438 439 598 724 888 918 954 992
Tignish (902) -  775 806 882
Tyne Valley (902) - 831

Premium services
Premium services in the numbering plan area are provided with central office code 976:  1-902/782-976-xxxx.

See also 

 Telephone numbers in Canada
 Canadian Numbering Administration Consortium

References

External links 
CNA exchange list for area +1-902
Telecom archives
 Area Code Map of Canada
List of exchanges from AreaCodeDownload.com, 902 Area Code
Area code 902
wetmore
782 Wetmore

902
Area codes
Area codes
Area codes